is a Japanese author of science fiction and fantasy light novels. He is best known for his novel All You Need Is Kill, which formed the basis of the film Edge of Tomorrow, starring Tom Cruise and Emily Blunt.

Life and career
Sakurazaka originally began in a career in IT.

He made his literary debut in 2002 at the second Super Dash Novel Rookie of the Year Award with Mahō tsukai no netto, which was later published in December 2003 under the name Yoku Wakaru Gendai Mahō. This work has subsequently been expanded into a series of light novels and has been made into an anime. In 2004 he was presented the S-F Magazine Readers Award's best short story award for "The Saitama Chain Saw Massacre". His 2004 novel All You Need Is Kill received high praise from other authors in Japan and has been published in English by Viz Media.

Sakurazaka has an interest in computers and video games. He is knowledgeable about computer culture, can program in Perl, is able to use specialized text editors such as Meadow, and can typeset in TeX.

Film adaptation
Sakurazaka's novel All You Need Is Kill was optioned by Warner Bros. Based upon the story, the screenplay was written by Dante Harper and Joby Harold with a working title We Mortals Are. Originally Brad Pitt was approached to play the lead, but he had conflicts with other films for which Warner wanted him. In October 2011, Tom Cruise began talks for the project to be directed by Doug Liman. In June 2014 the movie premiered with the title Edge of Tomorrow.

Awards
2004: S-F Magazine Readers Award Best Short Story for 
 English translation of this short story was included in the anthology Hanzai Japan (Haikasoru, 2015).

Bibliography
 All You Need Is Kill (2004); English translation: All You Need Is Kill (2009), retitled mass-market paperback edition: Edge of Tomorrow (2014)
  (2005); Revised:  (2014); (English version contains a short story  (2010).  Revised Japanese version included the same short.) (2010)
  (2008) (co-written with Hiroki Azuma)

Yoku Wakaru Gendai Mahō series
  (2003)
 Revised version:  (2008)
  (2004)
  (2004)
  (2005)
  (2005)
  (2009)

References

 
Entry in The Encyclopedia of Science Fiction

External links
 Hiroshi Sakurazaka manga works in Media Arts Database 

1970 births
Living people
Japanese science fiction writers